Ben Fouhy (born 4 March 1979, in Taumarunui) is a New Zealand flatwater and marathon canoeist who has been competing since the early 2000s. Competing in three Summer Olympics, he won the silver in the K-1 1000 m event at Athens in 2004, as well as finishing fourth in the 2008 Olympics and ninth in the 2012 Olympics in the same event. He is the recipient of the 2003 Halberg Award for NZ Sportsman of the Year and a former world record holder in the K1 1000m event.

Career history
Fouhy began kayaking competitively in 2002, following a background in multi-sport events. He discovered an aptitude for paddling after increasing his kayak training to improve his overall multisport performance.

After a handful of domestic wins Fouhy, an unknown on the international field at the time, took a surprise gold medal at the ICF Canoe Sprint World Championships in Gainesville, Georgia, USA, after which he won several Sportsperson of the Year titles including the coveted Halberg Award.

The following year, at the 2004 Athens Olympics, Fouhy achieved New Zealand’s first medal in Kayaking since the 1980s.

In 2005 Fouhy was made a Member of the New Zealand Order of Merit (MNZM).

Career highlights 
 Gold Medal in K1 1000m – 2003 World Cup regatta Poznan, Poland
 Gold Medal in K1 1000m & K1 500m – 2005 Australian National Championships, Sydney
 Halberg Award – 2003 New Zealand Sportsman of the Year
 Bronze Medal in K1 marathon – 2005 World Marathon Championships, Perth
 Gold Medal in K1 1000m – 2004 English National Championships, Nottingham
 Olympic Silver Medal in K1 1000m – 2004 Athens Olympics
 Bronze Medal in K1 1000m – 2006 World Championships, Szeged, Hungary
 Gold Medal in K2 1000m – 2004 NZ Sprint National Championships, Auckland
 World Champion K1 1000m – 2003 World Championships, Gainesville, Georgia, U.S.
 Gold Medal in K1 1000m – 2004 NZ Sprint National Championships, Auckland
 Gold Medal, Worlds fastest time in K1 1000m – 2006 World Cup regatta, Poland
 Gold Medal in K1 1000m – 2003 NZ Sprint National Championships, Auckland

References
 Official website

External links
 
 

1979 births
Living people
New Zealand male canoeists
Olympic canoeists of New Zealand
Olympic silver medalists for New Zealand
Olympic medalists in canoeing
Medalists at the 2004 Summer Olympics
Canoeists at the 2004 Summer Olympics
Canoeists at the 2008 Summer Olympics
Canoeists at the 2012 Summer Olympics
ICF Canoe Sprint World Championships medalists in kayak
Medalists at the ICF Canoe Marathon World Championships
People from Taumarunui
People educated at Palmerston North Boys' High School